The Elsa is a river in the Italian region of Tuscany. It flows northward to empty into the left bank of the Arno. From its source at Molli, Sovicelle, the flow of the river is low until its reaches its major tributaries at Vene di Onci and Caldane. The mouth of the river divides Frazione Marcignana of Empoli and Isola, San Miniato. The basin of the Elsa has been continuously inhabited since at least the time of the Etruscan civilization.

The Elsa River Basin is located between Montagnola Senese and the rolling hills of Chianti, roughly corresponding to the eponymous valley Val d'Elsa. Catchments are predominantly fan shaped. It encompasses a number of comune (municipalities) in the provinces of Florence and Siena.

References

Rivers of the Province of Siena
Rivers of the Province of Florence